Ruh or RUH may refer to:

 Rūḥ, an Arabic word meaning soul
 Royal United Hospital, in Bath, England
 Royal University Hospital, in Saskatoon, Saskatchewan, Canada
 Ruga language (ISO 639-3: ruh), a moribund Tibeto-Burman language of India
 King Khalid International Airport (IATA: RUH), near Riyadh, Saudi Arabia

People with the surname 
 Debra Ruh (born 1958), American activist
 Lucinda Ruh (born 1979), Swiss figure skater
 Philip Ruh (1883–1962), German-Canadian architect and Catholic priest